Carsten Heymann (born 7 January 1972) is a German former biathlete. He competed in the men's sprint event at the 1998 Winter Olympics.

References

External links
 

1972 births
Living people
German male biathletes
Olympic biathletes of Germany
Biathletes at the 1998 Winter Olympics
People from Sebnitz
Sportspeople from Saxony
20th-century German people